Laverton established in 1886, is a suburb of Melbourne, Victoria, Australia,  south-west of Melbourne's Central Business District, located within the Cities of Hobsons Bay and Wyndham local government areas. Laverton recorded a population of 4,760 at the 2021 census.

It was home to the RAAF Base (RAAF Williams), and covers 148 ha in the suburb of Laverton. Laverton was originally established to support the greater rate of flying and maintenance activities after the formation of the RAAF in 1921. Many homes in the surrounding area were colloquially called the “cabbage patch”, in reference to the boom of young families after the return of soldiers from WWII. Fences in the area also used to be low (below 1m) to originally form a shared community with no fence at the front. This style has recently been changed particularly on the main arterials throughout Laverton with higher fences being built in line with local council building policies. The military airfield at RAAF Williams, Laverton was decommissioned and has now been developed into a new suburb – Williams Landing.
 
The Laverton base and airfield was established by the Royal Australian Air Force on 01 March 1926, and is the third oldest RAAF base in Australia. Home to No 1 Aircraft Depot between 1926 and 1994, Laverton has also housed flying units, Support and Training Command Headquarters, No 6 RAAF Hospital and training and administrative functions. The airfield was officially closed in 1996 and subsequently sold for suburban housing development.

Laverton Swim and Fitness Centre (LSFC), originally called Laverton Memorial Swimming Pool, was proudly funded by the residents and Werribee Shire council (who owned the suburb of Laverton prior to 2014 handover to Hobsons Bay City Council). It opened in June 1976 and was dedicated to those who had served in various conflicts in which Australia had been involved. A WWII memorial plaque was installed, however removed or possibly stolen and is to be replaced with an identical plaque in 2022. A petition was launched by Laverton Residents in 2020, in support by Wetlands Ward Councillors as part of their campaign to be voted in, however a decision by the previous council in 2021 was made to close the pool, supported by the Wetlands Ward councillors in 2022, to instead build a new state-of-the-art pool in the neighbouring suburb of Altona Meadows for $60m as part of the Western Aquatic Strategy 2019-2030. The feasibility of this project to break ground at the new site of Bruce Comben Reserve, Altona Meadows - is to be reviewed by February 2023.

Other notable Laverton facilities are the Woods Street Art Space, The Hub community Centre and many up and coming new restaurants and cafes with upgrades planned to support the growth of the suburb (7,500 by 2031 up from  approximately 4,700 as per 2021 census).

Laverton is home to the Melbourne Ballpark state baseball stadium, which hosts several national events each year, including home games of the Melbourne aces who compete in the Australian Baseball League. The facility resides on what is known as the Altona Meadows side of the M2 highway.

Laverton is connected to the Werribee railway line at Laverton station and Aircraft station.

Laverton is serviced by a network of primary and secondary state arterial roads, including major arterials such as the Princes Freeway, where there is an entry ramp via Point Cook Road (Aviation Road), and 5 exits into and out of Laverton.

Replacement of the railway crossing with a bridge at Aircraft station was finished in 2019 and future potential works to reroute traffic from and to Point Cook Road, which is predominantly used by city bound Point Cook residents travelling by vehicle.

History

Laverton's history starts in 1886 when the sale of land in the suburb was promoted by Staples Wise and Company. The first station to be opened beyond Newport on the way to Geelong was Laverton station, in the same year. Laverton Post Office opened on 9 April 1888. Today Aircraft station is nearby, named from the Williams Laverton RAAF base, opened in 1921, seven years after a base was established at Point Cook.

In the 1950s, a second primary school was built in Laverton, having over 900 students in 1966. Two more primary schools and a high school were established around this time. There is a police station near Laverton railway station.

Demographics

In the 2011 census the population of Laverton was 4,065, approximately 47.4% female and 52.6% male. The median/average age of the people in Laverton is 31 years of age.

47.1% of people living in the suburb of Laverton were born in Australia. The other top responses for country of birth were 14.0% India, 4.7% Burma, 2.6% Philippines, 2.4% New Zealand, 2.4% England, 2.3% Thailand, 1.6% China, 1.5% Vietnam, 0.8% Scotland, 0.5% Nepal, 0.5% Cambodia, 0.5% Sudan, 0.5% Italy, 0.5% Ethiopia.

51.7% of people living in Laverton speak English only. The other top languages spoken are 12.7% Other, 7.9% Punjabi, 5.5% Language spoken at home not stated, 2.8% Hindi, 1.9% Arabic, 1.8% Other, 1.8% Vietnamese, 1.4% Mandarin, 1.3% Spanish.

The religious makeup of Laverton is 22.8% Catholic, 17.9% No religion, 8.5% Anglican, 8.3% Religious affiliation not stated, 7.7% Other Religious Groups, 7.6% Baptist, 6.8% Hinduism, 3.7% Islam, 3.2% Buddhism, 2.8% Eastern Orthodox.

Transport

Train 
Laverton is home to two train stations; Aircraft Station and Laverton Station, both of which are serviced by trains on the Werribee railway line.

Bus
 Route 400: Sunshine Station to Laverton Station
 Route 411: Laverton Station to Footscray (via Altona Meadows and Altona)
 Route 412: Laverton Station to Footscray (via Altona Meadows and Altona)
 Route 414: Laverton Station to Footscray
 Route 415: Laverton Station to Williamstown (via Altona)
 Route 417: Laverton Station to Laverton Station (via Laverton North)
 Route 496: Laverton Station to Sanctuary Lakes
 Route 498: Laverton Station to Hoppers Crossing Station
 Route 903: Altona to Mordialloc (SMARTBUS Service)

Royal Australian Air Force bases

Laverton was the home to RAAF Base Laverton. The base is no longer used for operational flying. In 2008 the base became part of the new suburb of Williams Landing. For administrative purposes, it is now merged with the former RAAF Base Point Cook as RAAF Base Williams. Point Cook is home to the RAAF Museum, where visitors can see many different types of historical RAAF aircraft. RAAF Williams is also home to the Laverton depot of the Australian Army Reserves 8/7 Battalion of the Royal Victorian Regiment.

Scouts

Laverton is home to the 1st Laverton Air Scout group which began in approximately 1952. In the past, it was an active 'Air Scout' Group given the local RAAF base. The group currently has Joey Scouts, Cub Scouts and Scouts. It meets in a hall on railway land near the Laverton railway station. This hall is also used by local sports clubs and gets hired out for parties.

Laverton also has the 2nd Laverton Scout group, this group includes gardening for children as part of it activities.

Sport

The suburb has an Australian rules football team (Laverton Magpies) competing in the Western Region Football League.

The Laverton Cricket Club is also based at Laverton Park. It currently has five senior teams and a large number of junior sides.

Golfers play at the course of the RAAF Williams Golf Club.

A skate park, based at McCormick Park, caters to skaters and BMX riders.

See also
 City of Werribee – Laverton was previously within this former local government area.

References

External links

Suburbs of Melbourne
Suburbs of the City of Hobsons Bay
Suburbs of the City of Wyndham